Tommy Robredo defeated José Acasuso 7–5, 6–0 to win the 2007 Orange Prokom Open singles event.

Seeds

Draws

Key
Q - Qualifier
WC - Wild Card
SE - Special Exempt
LL - Lucky loser
r - Retired

Finals

Top half

Bottom half

External links
 Main Draw
 Qualifying Draw

Singles